St John Ambulance Guernsey, also known as St John Guernsey (STG) is a charitable voluntary first aid organisation and the division of St John Ambulance in Guernsey. It provides workplace and community first aid sessions to over-16s, and helps provide the emergency services for the State of Guernsey, as well as providing all the ambulances in use. The organisation offers associate member insurance to citizens who have qualifications in First Aid. In 2020, due to the COVID-19 pandemic in Guernsey, the organisation was forced to make over 250 staff redundant, as it was losing £1.4 million per week when delivering essential supplies to islanders' homes., later in November 2020, the charity announced it would be offering around 30,000 volunteers to help carry out vaccinations.

References

External links
 
 Facebook page

Organisations based in Guernsey
St John Ambulance